Liquid junction potential (shortly LJP) occurs when two solutions of electrolytes of different concentrations are in contact with each other. The more concentrated solution will have a tendency to diffuse into the comparatively less concentrated one. The rate of diffusion of each ion will be roughly proportional to its speed in an electric field, or their ion mobility. If the anions diffuse more rapidly than the cations, they will diffuse ahead into the dilute solution, leaving the latter negatively charged and the concentrated solution positively charged. This will result in an electrical double layer of positive and negative charges at the junction of the two solutions. Thus at the point of junction, a potential difference will develop because of the ionic transfer. This potential is called liquid junction potential or diffusion potential which is non-equilibrium potential.  The magnitude of the potential depends on the relative speeds of the 'ions' movement.

Calculation

The liquid junction potential cannot be measured directly but calculated. The electromotive force (EMF) of  a concentration cell with transference includes the liquid junction potential.

The EMF of a concentration cell without transport is:

The EMF of a concentration cell with transport (including the ion transport number) is:

Liquid junction potential is the difference between the two EMFs of the two concentration cells, with and without ionic transport:

Elimination

The liquid junction potential interferes with the exact measurement of the electromotive force of a chemical cell, so its effect should be minimized as much as possible for accurate measurement. The most common method of eliminating the liquid junction potential is to place a salt bridge consisting of a saturated solution of potassium chloride (KCl) and ammonium nitrate (NH4NO3) with lithium acetate (CH3COOLi) between the two solutions constituting the junction. When such a bridge is used, the ions in the bridge are present in large excess at the junction and they carry almost the whole of the current across the boundary. The efficiency of KCl/NH4NO3 is connected with the fact that in these salts, the transport numbers of anions and cations are the same.

See also
Concentration cell
Ion transport number
ITIES
Electrochemical kinetics

References
 Advanced Physical Chemistry by Gurtu & Snehi
 Principles of Physical Chemistry by Puri, Sharma, Pathania

External links
 J. Phys. Chem. Elimination of the junction potențial with glass electrode

 Open source Liquid Junction Potential calculator

 Junction Potential Explanation Video

Diffusion
Ions
Physical chemistry
Electrochemistry
Electrochemical potentials